The Ve Skerries or Vee Skerries (West Skerries) are a group of low skerries (rocky islands)  north west of Papa Stour, on the west coast of Shetland, Scotland. They define the southwest perimeter of St Magnus Bay.

Skerries
The skerries are:

 North Skerry
 Ormal ( - remnant or fragment)
 The Clubb (Shetland dialect: hill square in shape, from  - crag or rugged hill-top)
 Reaverack
 Helligoblo

Ve Skerries Lighthouse 

This modern lighthouse on the west side of Ormal was erected following the loss of Elinor Viking. It replaced a lighted buoy itself put in place after the loss of Ben Doran. It was also put in place to serve the increase in shipping brought about by the construction of Sullom Voe oil terminal.

Built by engineer R. J. MacKay, the lighthouse was first lit on 27 September 1979. The tower is anchored with 18 steel bars, which are secured between  into the skerry below. Despite its remote location, construction only took four months with the aid of helicopters, whereas using conventional techniques might have made construction take a matter of years. The use of post-tensioning in the lighthouse's construction was the first example of the technique's use in Scotland. In 2020 the lighthouse was nominated to become a Category B listed building.

The lighthouse is not open to the public; its exposed location makes landings by sea difficult.

Wrecks
Due to the low depth of water in the vicinity, and unpredictable currents, the Ve Skerries are notorious for their danger to passing ships. Many ships have wrecked on the rocks.

Illeri

While travelling between the Faroe Islands and Leith in ballast under the command of Captain Samuelson, Illeri went aground on the northeast end of the Ve Skerries early in the morning of Sunday 9 May 1909 due to poor visibility in thick fog. The conditions were calm enough to allow the crew to consider abandoning ship in a smaller boat kept aboard. When the ship started breaking up, the ship's papers were gathered and it was abandoned. The boat was directed to Muckle Roe, where they were redirected to Olnafirth where the Norwegian Olna Whaling Station was based, to which they safely arrived.

On the same morning, a report from Sandness reached Divisional Officer Mr Rogers at Fort Charlotte, Lerwick that the ship had wrecked. He summoned the Northern Lighthouse Commissioners' steamship Pole Star (which was leaving port) by semaphore to return and conveyed the report to the chief officer. Pole Star then proceeded to the Ve Skerries, where they found the ship waterlogged and abandoned. The ships' state indicated it had been quickly abandoned - The Orkney Herald reported that "they found the sails merely clued up, but not stowed, the side lights burning, and a 24 hour alarm timepiece lying on the cabin table still going." They were able to retrieve more of the ship's papers still aboard the vessel, which were passed on to the Receiver of Wreck in Scalloway. The following day Pole Star learned the crew had arrived in Olnafirth while delivering supplies to Muckle Roe.

Some of the Illeri crew (including the captain) visited the wreck again on Monday 10 May, however the ship was by then "a total wreck". The crew were forwarded on to Lerwick on 11 May, and were then sent by the Norwegian Consul to Leith aboard SS Queen on Thursday 13 May.

Ben Doran

On 29 March 1930, the Aberdeen steam trawler Ben Doran ran aground on the north end of Heligoblo in bad weather and rough sea conditions, due in part to poor coverage in nautical charts of the area, and lack of knowledge of the tides around the shallow reef surrounding the Ve Skerries which were considered unpredictable even to experienced Shetland fishermen. Another passing trawler brought news of the accident to Lerwick by 5pm, after which the Stromness Lifeboat Station in Orkney was notified, and Board of Trade's life-saving apparatus - a rocket propelled rope to shoot to another vessel, to allow for it to be towed to safety - was arranged and taken by lorry to Ronas Voe. The apparatus was taken aboard the steam trawler Arora and it departed towards the Ve Skerries at 2am on 30 March.

Honorary Secretary of the RNLI's Lerwick branch, George Theodore Kay, who was aware of the geography of the Ve Skerries, thought that a ship the size of Arora would struggle to come close enough to Ben Doran to effect a rescue attempt. He learned that a smaller motor boat named Smiling Morn was berthed in Voe, Delting, and suggested that this vessel accompanied by a four-oared rowing boat would have a better chance at success. He, with John Falconer, master of the trawler Boscobell, and W. H. Dougall from The Missions to Seamen proceeded to Voe and enrolled the assistance of Smiling Morn. They headed for Housa Voe, Papa Stour to procure the expertise of someone there with experience of the seabed around the Ve Skerries. By entering Housa Voe in rough conditions and during the night, they themselves nearly collided with a sunken rock. Upon landfall in Housa Voe they enlisted the assistance of John Henderson, and headed towards the Ve Skerries.

Smiling Morn arrived before 5am at the Ve Skerries, which Arora had reached first. Heavy seas and high winds continued and proved to make a very difficult rescue attempt. Five of Ben Doran'''s crew were seen clinging to the ship's rigging while sea spray hit them. Arora made an approach, however they only reached in far enough that their crew thought that they would not be able to return to safety, and still Ben Doran was out of reach. Retreating, they relayed that an additional two crewmembers were spotted in the rigging. Kay, who examined the area 2 months later, commented that it was "abundantly clear that rescue would have been hopeless."

At one point a "tide lump" (Shetland dialect: a rapid escalation of tidal activity) fell into the  rowing boat which Smiling Morn had in tow, and it sank. Smiling Morns skipper, John Jamieson, was adamant in attempting a rescue despite the danger to his own crew, and due to this a fight nearly broke out upon the ship, leading the rest of the crew to tie him up to keep him from doing so. Despite the effort put in by the crew of each of the would-be rescue vessels, they resolved that nothing more could be done and so they abandoned the rescue.

The Stromness Lifeboat Station was alerted to the unsuccessful attempt by 4pm 30 March. By 4:45pm the Stromness Lifeboat departed, reaching Scalloway by 7:30am on 31 March. By the time the lifeboat arrived at the Ve Skerries, only the gallows for supporting the ship's anchor could be seen. All of the nine crew members believed to have been on board were killed. The wrecking of Ben Doran and the deaths of the crew validated the need for a lifeboat to be stationed in Shetland. In 1933 the Aith Lifeboat Station was opened.

The wreck of the Ben Doran is used as a dive site for sport divers and underwater photographers.

Elinor Viking

On 9 December 1977 Elinor Viking, an Aberdeen trawler was wrecked on the east side of Reaverack due to extreme weather conditions. The Aith Lifeboat was sent to the scene, however due to the wreck's position it was not able to get close enough to the vessel to transfer to the crew to safety. Both of the ship's liferafts had been swept away by the sea, and the ship had been breached and lay half-filled with water. An appeal was made to Sumburgh Airport where British Airways had helicopters stationed, and a volunteer crew was assembled, including Captain George Bain as the chief pilot, and Major Alasdair Campbell as a winchman.

They reached the scene within about an hour and, with the aid of another helicopter and an RAF Nimrod trying to provide light in the dark conditions, they proceeded with the rescue attempt in horrendous weather. The light coming from dropped flares from the Nimrod was deemed impossible to time correctly with the winch lowering, such that their only effective source of light was the helicopter's landing lights. Elinor Viking had developed considerable list as it began to sink. Campbell, upon his first attempt being lowered down to the ship, was unexpectedly swayed and his cable became caught in the mast of the ship. The risk of losing the helicopter meant that the winch operator nearly took the decision to sever the cable to Campbell, however he was able to be retrieved back into the helicopter and immediately offered to be lowered again. Using a rock which was repeatedly out of view with the swell as the best reference, Bain was able to keep the aircraft steady to continue the rescue. Through the following hour and twenty minutes, lowering approximately twelve times, Campbell was able to hoist up the crew. The last to leave the ship was the skipper, who (either through hypothermia or shock) could not let go of the ships railing, requiring Campbell to hit him to continue the rescue.

Despite the crew of the helicopter not being trained for rescue work, all 8 of Elinor Viking's crew were successfully winched to safety. Both Bain and Campbell received Queen's Gallantry Medals for "outstanding bravery, skill and determination in conditions of extreme weather and darkness operating in a situation far beyond that normally expected of a helicopter on rescue service."

Coelleira

Apart from the low light, the conditions were ideal - there was clear visibility, smooth seas and light winds. At 21:42 the heading was set to 204°.

At 22:30 the skipper (a 56-year-old Spanish national) took over watch from the mate, who went to bed. The skipper over the next 2 hours made five adjustments to the ships' heading in order to follow the coast. The skipper during this time worked on fish landing records and other managerial work. It is not known how often the vessel's position was checked.

The skipper did not see any hazards on the chartplotter, and while he did see a lighthouse light towards the port bow, he assumed it was a lighthouse on the mainland.

The crew awoke with the sound of the collision, whereupon they assembled in the wheelhouse and donned survival suits and life jackets. Two lifeboats were launched off the starboard side. At 01:29 the Shetland Coastguard were notified of the accident, and in response the Aith lifeboat and a rescue helicopter were sent to the scene. All 15 crew were winched aboard the helicopter, and were returned to Lerwick uninjured.

Attempts were subsequently made to refloat the vessel. The ship was surveyed with assistance from the Sullom Voe Terminal tug Tystie, however during the inspection the vessel rolled 5-10° to port, at which point the men aboard were evacuated. The emergency towing vessel Ievoli Black attempted to pull Coelleira'' off the Clubb on 7 August, however during the attempt the ship tilted over 55° to port, and with a forecast of poor sea conditions and weather the ship was deemed unsalvageable. In the following days the ship broke up and sank.

In its report on the incident, the Marine Accident Investigation Branch concluded that the planning of the passage between the fishing grounds and Scrabster was inadequate, the ship's position was not kept track of, and bridge was empty when the ship went aground. They posed that the skipper's decision making may have been impacted by fatigue, while the set up of the bridge's controls may have made it more difficult to observe risks to the ship.

Folklore 
Following his tour of Shetland, Samuel Hibbert reported that the Ve Skerries were recounted by Shetlanders as being a retreat of the "Haaf-fish" (more commonly known as selkies) - creatures that would take the appearance of seal, but could take off their skins and would appear human, allowing them to fraternise on land. Because seal clubbing was (in the past) practised, and because seals would tend to lie on the Ve Skerries, the islanders of Papa Stour would go there to hunt the seals for the purpose of retrieving their skins, and according to these tales, would sometimes end up hunting the selkies.

One such tale attested that a seal hunter in a party of several, after killing and skinning several seals, was caught out by a sudden swell which caused the rest of the group to assemble in their boat, but left him stranded. Despite trying to rescue him, he had to be abandoned due to the worsening weather. Several selkies (in the form of seals) then landed on the Ve Skerries, took off their skins and proceeded to rescue those of their kind who had been clubbed, stunned and skinned by the hunters. Those who had been skinned began to regain consciousness, and expressed their sorrow over the loss of their only way to return home (each selkie only possessing a single skin). In particular, one selkie named Ollavitinus would not be able to return to his wives and would be imprisoned on land. When the stranded hunter was spotted, Ollavitinus' mother Gioga offered to transport him back to Papa Stour as long as he would return her son's skin, which the hunter agreed to. With the weather worsening, the hunter feared he would not be able to hold on to the seal skin of Gioga all the way back, and pleaded to be allowed to cut holes in her skin to which he could hold, to which Gioga complied. The hunter was successfully transported to Akers Geo, Papa Stour, after which he dutifully retrieved Ollavitinus' skin from a skeo (Shetland dialect: a hut of loosely constructed stone for wind-drying meat or fish) in Hamnavoe, allowing him to return to the sea and his wives.

See also

 List of lighthouses in Scotland
 List of Northern Lighthouse Board lighthouses
 List of shipwrecks of the United Kingdom
 MFV Elinor Viking
 MV Coelleira
 Out Skerries
 Papa Stour
 Selkie
 SS Ben Doran
 St Magnus Bay
 SV Illeri

Citations

General sources 

 

 

Archipelagoes of Scotland
Skerries of Scotland
Underwater diving sites in Scotland
Uninhabited islands of Shetland